Major Peter Montefiore Samuel, 4th Viscount Bearsted MC TD (9 December 1911 – 9 June 1996) was a British peer and a director of Shell Transport and Trading. He also was a deputy chairman of Shell Transport and Trading. Samuel was commissioned into the Warwickshire Yeomanry in March 1936. He served throughout the Second World War, being awarded the Military Cross in 1943 and ending the war as an acting major. He succeeded his elder brother in the viscountcy in 1986.

Titles and honours

 Mr Peter Samuel (1911–1927)
 The Hon. Peter Samuel (1927–1943)
 The Hon. Peter Samuel MC (1943–1951)
 The Hon. Peter Samuel MC TD (1951–1986)
 The Rt. Hon. The Viscount Bearsted MC TD (1986–1996)

References

External links

Portraits of Peter Montefiore Samuel, 4th Viscount Bearsted in the National Portrait Galley

1911 births
1996 deaths
Recipients of the Military Cross
Viscounts in the Peerage of the United Kingdom
English people of Iraqi-Jewish descent
Warwickshire Yeomanry officers
British politicians of Iraqi descent
British Army personnel of World War II